"Seeing Double" is the first 7" single of English new wave band the Teardrops, released on TJM Records, in 1979.

The band comprised John Key, Trev Wain, Karl Burns (ex-Fall drummer) and Jim Donnelly, being credited in the black sleeve of the single. Initially, Steve Garvey, then of Buzzcocks, was also a member, but he did not participate on this disc, despite having played in the two first EPs, In and Out of Fashion and Leave Me No Choice in 1978; however, according to the list of the discography of all the Buzzcocks members, he played, only with Burns and also ex-Fall member Tony Friel.

Track listing
A. "Seeing Double" (Burns/Wain)
B. "Teardrops and Heartaches" (Wain/Key)

Credits
Band
John Key
Trev Wain
Karl Burns
Jim Donnely

Production
The Teardrops

References

External links
Rateyourmusic.com entry

1979 songs
1979 debut singles
British punk rock songs